Alvaradoia disjecta is a moth of the family Noctuidae first described by Walter Rothschild in 1920. It is found in eastern Spain and south-eastern France.

The wingspan is 20–28 mm. Adults are mainly on the wing from June to July, but have also been recorded at the beginning of September, suggesting a second generation.

The larvae feed on the leaves of Santolina chamaecyparissus.

References

External links
"09120a Alvaradoia disjecta (Rothschild, 1920)". Lepiforum e. V. Retrieved October 2, 2020. 
"Alvaradoia disjecta Rothsch." Lépi' Net. Retrieved October 2, 2020. 

Moths described in 1920
Acontiinae
Moths of Europe